Colomán Trabado Pérez (born 2 January 1958 in Vega de Valcarce, El Bierzo, León Province) is a retired middle-distance runner from Spain. He won the European Indoor Championships in 1983 and the inaugural World Indoor Games in 1985.

An athletics stadium in Ponferrada, the main city of the El Bierzo region, is named the Estadio Municipal de Atletismo Colomán Trabado.

International competitions

1Disqualified in the final
2Did not finish in the quarterfinals

References

External links

Spanish Olympic Committee

1958 births
Living people
People from El Bierzo
Sportspeople from the Province of León
Spanish male middle-distance runners
Athletes (track and field) at the 1980 Summer Olympics
Athletes (track and field) at the 1984 Summer Olympics
Athletes (track and field) at the 1988 Summer Olympics
Olympic athletes of Spain
Members of the 5th Assembly of Madrid
Members of the 6th Assembly of Madrid
Members of the 7th Assembly of Madrid
Members of the 8th Assembly of Madrid
Members of the 9th Assembly of Madrid
Members of the People's Parliamentary Group (Assembly of Madrid)
Mediterranean Games bronze medalists for Spain
Mediterranean Games medalists in athletics
Athletes (track and field) at the 1979 Mediterranean Games
Athletes (track and field) at the 1983 Mediterranean Games
World Athletics Indoor Championships winners
20th-century Spanish people